The Pârâul Alb is a left tributary of the river Feneș in Romania. It discharges into the Feneș in the village Feneș.

References

Rivers of Romania
Rivers of Caraș-Severin County